Operation Sea Breeze  was a combined military operation launched by the Sri Lanka Armed Forces in Mullaitivu. It was the first amphibious operation launched by the Sri Lankan military in its history. The operation was carried out to break the siege and reinforce the Sri Lanka Army camp in Mullaitivu. It was successfully carried out and the area controlled by the camp was extended.

References

Sea Breeze
1990 in Sri Lanka
September 1990 events in Asia
Sea Breeze
Sea Breeze